|}

This is a list of Legislative Council results for the Victorian 2002 state election. 22 of the 44 seats were contested.

Results by province

Ballarat

Central Highlands

Chelsea

Doutta Galla

East Yarra

Eumemmerring

Geelong

Gippsland

Higinbotham

Jika Jika

Koonung

Melbourne

Melbourne North

Melbourne West

Monash

North Eastern

North Western

Silvan

Templestowe

Waverley

Western

Western Port

By-elections

There were a total of 2 Legislative Council by-elections that took place on election day following the resignation of MLCs elected at the 1999 election.

East Yarra 

This election followed the vacancy caused by the resignation of Mark Birrell, who resigned. The by-election was conducted on the same day as the 2002 election, but used the old electoral boundaries.

Western 

This election followed the vacancy caused by the resignation of Roger Hallam, who resigned. The by-election was conducted on the same day as the 2002 election, but used the old electoral boundaries.

See also 

 2002 Victorian state election
 Candidates of the 2002 Victorian state election

References 

Results of Victorian state elections
2000s in Victoria (Australia)